Shivani Bhai is an Indian actress, model, and host who has appeared in Malayalam, Telugu, and Tamil language films

Career
Shivani made her debut in Malayalam with Mammooty as his sister in Annan Thampi. She acted as heroine in her third Malayalam movie, Rahasya Police, with Jayaram in 2009. Her second movie was Bullet with Suresh Gopi.

Her movie as heroine was Naanga. Her folk song is "Adiye pottapulla" in Naanga.

Filmography

References

External links
 

Living people
21st-century Indian actresses
Actresses from Thiruvananthapuram
Female models from Thiruvananthapuram
Actresses in Malayalam cinema
Actresses in Tamil cinema
Indian film actresses
Indian television actresses
Actresses in Malayalam television
Year of birth missing (living people)